Muneeba or Muniba is a given name. Notable people and characters with the name include:

People
 Muneeba Ali (born 1997), Pakistani cricketer
 Muneeba Yaseen, actor in 3 Bahadur
 Muniba Mazari (born 1987), Pakistani activist

Fictional characters
 Muneeba Khan, Marvel Comics character

See also
 Muneeb

Arabic feminine given names
Pakistani feminine given names